Uranothauma falkensteini, the lowland branded blue, is a butterfly in the family Lycaenidae.

Range and habitat

It is found in Guinea, Sierra Leone, Liberia, Ivory Coast, Ghana, Togo, Nigeria (south and the Cross River loop), Cameroon, the Republic of the Congo, the Central African Republic, Angola, the DRC, Uganda, Kenya, Tanzania, Malawi, Zambia, Mozambique and Zimbabwe. The habitat consists of forests.

Habits and food plants
Adult males are attracted to damp patches and traps baited with fish, prawn or toad. Both sexes are attracted to flowers. The larvae feed on Acacia abyssinica, Albizia adianthifolia and Albizia gummifera. They feed on the young shoots of their host plant.

References

Butterflies described in 1879
Uranothauma
Butterflies of Africa
Taxa named by Hermann Dewitz